Ryorigawa Dam  is a gravity dam located in Iwate Prefecture in Japan. The dam is used for flood control and water supply. The catchment area of the dam is 1.6 km2. The dam impounds about 3  ha of land when full and can store 486 thousand cubic meters of water. The construction of the dam was started on 1986 and completed in 2000.

See also
List of dams in Japan

References

Dams in Iwate Prefecture